Sangha (from Sanskrit saṃgha 'assembly') most often refers to:
Sangha (Buddhism), the fourfold community of pious Buddhists, and sometimes refers specifically to the body of Buddhist clergy
Sangha (Jainism), the fourfold community of pious followers of Jainism
Sangat (Sikhism), the community of believers in Sikhism

Sangha may also refer to:

Places
Sangha, Mali, a rural commune in Mali
Sangha Department (Burkina Faso), a department in eastern Burkina Faso
Sangha Department (Republic of the Congo), a department in northern Congo-Brazzaville
Sangha-Mbaéré, an economic prefecture in the Central African Republic
Sangha Trinational, a forest in Central Africa
Sangha River, a tributary of the Congo river of Central Africa

Other uses
Sangha people of the Republic of the Congo 
Sangh Parivar, a family of Hindu Nationalist organisations
 a type of republic or oligarchy in the eastern part of the Indian subcontinent
 Sangha (Vidhan Sabha constituency), a constituency of the Sikkim Legislative Assembly in India reserved for the Buddhist monastic community

See also
Sanga (disambiguation)
Sangam (disambiguation)
Sangh (disambiguation)